Paul "Shorty" Shorten is a former Canadian football wide receiver who played one season with the Winnipeg Blue Bombers of the Canadian Football League. He was drafted by the BC Lions in the second round of the 1987 CFL Draft. He played CIS football at the University of Toronto. He was also a member of the Gateshead Senators in the in Britain 1989-1991 British American Football Association and was inducted into the team's Hall of Fame in 2003.

References

External links
Just Sports Stats

Living people
Year of birth missing (living people)
Canadian football wide receivers
American football wide receivers
Canadian players of American football
Toronto Varsity Blues football players
Winnipeg Blue Bombers players
Canadian expatriate sportspeople in England